Pessi and Illusia is a 1984 Finnish fantasy film directed by Heikki Partanen. The film was selected as the Finnish entry for the Best Foreign Language Film at the 57th Academy Awards, but was not accepted as a nominee.

Cast
 Eija Ahvo as Hiiriäiti
 Riitta-Anneli Forss as Viihdytystaiteilija
 Raimo Grönberg as Isä
 Minka-Maija Halko as Ristilukin tyttö
 Sami Kangas as Pessi
 Rauno Ketonen as Isä Illusioni (voice)
 Pentti Lahti as Viihdytyskiertueen saksofonisti
 Katerina Lojdová as Kapteenin vaimo
 Annu Marttila as Illusia
 Pauli Pöllänen as Lumikko Martes

See also
 List of submissions to the 57th Academy Awards for Best Foreign Language Film
 List of Finnish submissions for the Academy Award for Best Foreign Language Film

References

External links
 

1984 films
1984 fantasy films
Finnish fantasy films
1980s Finnish-language films